Joseph Todd Peterson (born February 4, 1970) is a former American football placekicker. He was drafted by the New York Giants from the University of Georgia with the ninth pick of the seventh round (177th overall) in the 1993 NFL Draft. Peterson last played with the Atlanta Falcons in 2005. His contract with the Falcons expired on March 11, 2006 and he retired after that season.  He and his wife, Susan, are co-owners of Cabell's Designs LLC, with Cabell Sweeney.  Cabell's is a design and licensing group focusing on collegiately licensed products in the giftware industry.

College
Peterson spent two years at the U.S. Naval Academy before transferring to the University of Georgia where during Peterson's senior year, he led the SEC in field goal percentage, and was named the University's first GTE Academic All-American in more than a decade since Terry Hoage.  Peterson was also inducted into the University of Georgia's highest order, Sphinx in 1993.

Professional career
Peterson was drafted with the 9th pick in the 7th round of the 1993 NFL Draft, but didn't debut until 1994 with the Arizona Cardinals, where he only appeared in 2 games that season, before going to the Seattle Seahawks. Peterson went through his prime years as a Seahawk, from 1995-1999 until he got picked up by the Kansas City Chiefs, where he spent two years, when he then became a member of the Pittsburgh Steelers for the 2002 season. He then went to the San Francisco 49ers, where he spent two years. After the 2004 season, the Atlanta Falcons picked up Peterson, where he spent one season before his contract expired and he subsequently retired.  Peterson was honored as the NFL Man of the Year, 1996, in Seattle and served three terms totaling six years on the NFLPA's Board during his career.

NFL career statistics

Trivia

Peterson led the SEC in field goal percentage during his senior year at Georgia.
Graduated from Valdosta High School in Valdosta, Georgia.  Valdosta is the nation's winningest football program on the high school level. He was inducted as a member of the Valdosta High School Hall of Fame in 2007. In 2015 he was inducted during Athletes in Action “Night of Champions” into the Hall of Faith.
 Peterson and his family live in GA.
 He is affiliated with several Boards of Directors of both for and non profit organizations such as:  RoseRock Group in Bryan, TX; Passion Conferences and Passion City Church; Pro Athletes Outreach (Chairman); Seed Company (Chairman 2008–2013, Interim CEO 2014–2015); The Gathering.

External links
Todd Peterson at CBS.com

Notes and references
TheGoal.com ~ Todd Peterson
Yahoo! Sports ~ Todd Peterson
SI.com ~ Todd Peterson

1970 births
Living people
People from Valdosta, Georgia
Players of American football from Georgia (U.S. state)
American football placekickers
Georgia Bulldogs football players
New York Giants players
Arizona Cardinals players
Seattle Seahawks players
Kansas City Chiefs players
Pittsburgh Steelers players
San Francisco 49ers players
Atlanta Falcons players